Dianópolis is a municipality in the state of Tocantins in Brazil.

History

See also
List of municipalities in Tocantins

References

External links

 City Hall of Dianópolis website
 Government of the State of Tocantins website

Municipalities in Tocantins
Populated places established in 1884
1884 establishments in Brazil